Patna Lok Sabha constituency in Bihar existed from 1957 to 2008. Later it was split into two seats. Pataliputra and Patna Sahib.

Members of Parliament

1952-1957
In the 1st Lok Sabha (1952-1957), Patna had 4 Lok Sabha constituencies:

 Pataliputra : Sarangdhar Sinha, Indian National Congress 
 Patna Central : Kailash Pati Sinha, Indian National Congress
 Patna East :   Tarkeshwari Sinha, Indian National Congress 
 Patna-cum-Shahabad (renamed as Arrah) : Bali Ram Bhagat, Indian National Congress

1957-2008
From the 2nd to 14th Lok Sabha, Patna had 1 Lok Sabha.

2008-Present
From the 15th Lok Sabha (2009) onwards, the Patna Lok Sabha constituency has been bifurcated into 2 constituencies: Pataliputra and Patna Sahib.

Election Results

2004
 Ram Kripal Yadav  (RJD) : 433,853 votes   
 Chandreshwar Prasad Thakur (BJP) : 395,291

1999
 Chandreshwar Prasad Thakur (BJP) : 379,370 votes 
 Ram Kripal Yadav (RJD) : 332,478

1998 Re-election
 Chandreshwar Prasad Thakur (BJP) : 331,860 votes
 Ram Kripal Yadav (RJD) : 279,254

1998
The 1998 Lok Sabha election in Patna was countermanded due to reports of massive vote rigging.

1996
 Ram Kripal Yadav (JD) : 388,513
 S. N. Arya (BJP) : 349,046

1993 Re-election
 Ram Kripal Yadav (JD)

1991
The 1991 Lok Sabha election in Patna was countermanded due to reports of massive vote rigging. Janata Dal fielded Inder Kumar Gujral from here, and Janata Party fielded Yashwant Sinha.

1989
 Shailendra Nath Shrivastava (BJP) : 388,513
 Chandreshwar Prasad Thakur (INC) : 349,046

1984
 Chandreshwar Prasad Thakur (INC) : 214,909
 Ramavatar Shastri (CPI) : 142,808

1980
 Ramavatar Shastri (CPI) : 167,290
 Mahamaya Prasad Sinha (JP) : 146,877

1977
 Mahamaya Prasad Sinha (JP) : 382,363
 Ramavatar Shastri (CPI) : 59,238

1971
 Ramavatar Shastri (CPI) : 191,911
 Kailashpati Mishra (BJS) : 114,485

1967
 Ramavatar Shastri (CPI) : 148,963
 Ram Dulari Sinha (INC) : 66,822

1962
 Ram Dulari Sinha (INC) : 101,687
 Ramavatar Shastri (CPI) : 76,605

1957
 Sarangdhar Sinha (INC) : 75,618
 Ramavatar Shastri (CPI) : 66,936

See also
 List of Constituencies of the Lok Sabha
 Patna Sahib (Lok Sabha constituency)
 Pataliputra (Lok Sabha constituency)

References

Government of Patna
Former Lok Sabha constituencies of Bihar
Former constituencies of the Lok Sabha
2008 disestablishments in India
Constituencies disestablished in 2008